Eurema dina, the dina yellow, is a butterfly in the family Pieridae. The species was first described by Felipe Poey in 1832. It is found from Panama north to southern Florida. The species is regularly recorded from southern Texas and south-eastern Arizona. The habitat consists of forest edges, brushy fields and open forest.

Males are orange yellow with a very narrow black border on the outer and costal margins of the forewing. Females are yellow with black at the forewing tip. On the underside of both sexes, three black spots are found on the hindwing. The wet-season (summer) form is paler. Adults are on wing year round in southern Florida. Strays can be found in southern Texas in November and southern Arizona in October. Adults feed on flower nectar of Lantana, Asclepias and small-flowered Asteraceae species in South America.

The larvae feed on Alvaradoa amorphoides in Florida and Picramnia species in Central America.

Subspecies
The following subspecies are recognized:
E. d. dina (Cuba)
E. d. westwoodi (Boisduval, 1836) (Mexico, Costa Rica, Honduras, Panama)
E. d. parvumbra (Kaye, 1925) (Jamaica)
E. d. helios Bates, 1934 (Bahamas)
E. d. bayobanex Bates, 1939 (Haiti)

References

Dina
Butterflies of North America
Butterflies of Central America
Butterflies of the Caribbean
Butterflies of Cuba
Butterflies of Jamaica
Butterflies described in 1832